Al-Daghara Sport Club is an Iraqi football team based in Al-Daghara, Al-Qādisiyyah, that plays in Iraq Division Three.

Managerial history
 Emad Al-Saeedi
 Sabah Ali Draiwish

See also 
 2000–01 Iraqi Elite League
 2001–02 Iraq FA Cup

References

External links
 Al-Daghara SC on Goalzz.com
 Iraq Clubs- Foundation Dates

1989 establishments in Iraq
Association football clubs established in 1989
Football clubs in Al-Qādisiyyah